This article lists political parties in Liberia. 
Liberia has a multi-party system with numerous political parties, in which no one party often has a chance of gaining power alone, and parties must work with each other to form coalition governments. Membership in parties tends to be fluid, as the party leader at the time holds significant influence over the ideology the party follows. As such, switching parties is more common than in other countries.

Represented parties

Unrepresented parties
All Liberia Coalition Party
Democratic Justice Party
Freedom Alliance Party of Liberia
Free Democratic Party
Labor Party of Liberia
Liberia Destiny Party
Liberia Equal Rights Party
Liberia People Democratic Party
National Democratic Party of Liberia
National Party of Liberia
National Reformation Party
National Union for Democratic Progress
National Vision Party of Liberia
New Deal Movement
Progressive Democratic Party
Reformed United Liberia Party
Union of Liberian Democrats
Vision for Liberia Transformation

Historical parties
Republican Party
True Whig Party

See also
 Politics of Liberia

References 

Liberia
 
Political parties
Liberia
Political parties